Arabikkadal is a 1983 Indian Malayalam-language film directed by J. Sasikumar and written by Vijayan Karote from a story by Sasikumar. The film stars Madhu, Srividya, Mohanlal and Ratheesh in major roles. The film features music composed by M. K. Arjunan.

Plot

Cast 
Madhu
Srividya
Mohanlal
Ratheesh
Shubha
Menaka
Nellikode Bhaskaran

Soundtrack 
The music was composed by M. K. Arjunan and the lyrics were written by Poovachal Khader.

Release

References

External links 
 

1983 films
1980s Malayalam-language films
Films directed by J. Sasikumar